Laka Rawali is a former Papua New Guinea international lawn bowler.

Bowls career
Rawali was selected as part of the five man team by Papua New Guinea for the 1984 World Outdoor Bowls Championship, which was held in Aberdeen, Scotland.

He won a gold medal at the 1987 Asia Pacific Bowls Championships in the fours at Lae in his home country.

References

Living people
Papua New Guinean male bowls players
Year of birth missing (living people)